"Honey, Do You Think I'm Wrong" is a country music song written by Al Dexter and Frankie Marvin, performed by Al Dexter and His Troopers, and released on the Columbia label (catalog no. 36898). In February 1946, it reached No. 2 on the folk chart. It spent eight weeks on the charts and was ranked as the No. 12 record in Billboard's year-end folk juke box chart. It was the "B-side" to "Guitar Polka" which peaked at No. 1.

See also
 Billboard Most-Played Folk Records of 1946

References

American country music songs
1946 songs
Songs written by Al Dexter